Jakob Swatosch (19 April 1891 – 14 May 1971) was an Austrian footballer. He played in three matches for the Austria national football team from 1911 to 1914. He was also part of Austria's squad for the football tournament at the 1912 Summer Olympics, but he did not play in any matches.

References

External links
 

1891 births
1971 deaths
Austrian footballers
Austria international footballers
Association football midfielders
1. Simmeringer SC players